Issachar Ber Ryback, also Riback (Іссахар-Бер Рибак; 2 February 1897, in Yelisavetgrad, Russian Empire (today Kropyvnytskyi, Ukraine) – 22 December 1935, in Paris) was a Jewish-Ukrainian-French painter.

Life 

Ryback attended the art school in Kiev until 1916. He joined a progressive group of painters and was influenced by advocates of a modern Jewish literature such as David Bergelson and David Hofstein. The painters Alexander Bogomazov and Alexandra Exter were in Kiev at the time, and they taught him in 1913.  
In 1916 El Lissitzky and Ryback were given the task to make Jewish art memorials of schtetls from Ukraine and Belarus.
When he participated in an exhibition of Jewish paintings and sculptures in Moscow the spring 1917, his works were especially recommended.

During the October Revolution in 1917, he took part in multiple activities to redefine avantgarde Yiddish culture, e.g., he was a member of Kultur Lige in Kiev. Later he went to Moscow.  After his father was killed by Petliura's soldiers in the pogroms in Ukraine, he fled in April 1921 to Kaunas and in October 1921 he obtained a visa for Germany. He was in Berlin until 1924.

He was a member of the Novembergruppe and exhibited his Cubist pictures at both the Berliner Secession and the Juryfreien Kunstausstellung.

He also illustrated three small Yiddish fairy tale books for Miriam Margolin. His Shtetl. Mayn Chorever Heym, a Gedekniss (Shtetl, My Destroyed Home. A memorial) was published in 1923 by Schwellen-Verlag.  It is a collection of lithographs of his home town which was destroyed by pogroms.  At the time the Jewish education organization World ORT was situated in Berlin and he made the design for its logo.

In 1924 he tried to work in the Soviet Union by decorating scenes at Yiddish theaters.

In 1926 he emigrated to Paris and did not return to Russia.

In 1928 he had a solo exhibition in the "Galerie aux Quatre Chemins“ and in 1929 in the "Galerie L’Art Contemporain“. His style of painting had turned to the Expressionistic coloring of the School of Paris in the interwar period. Further exhibitions followed at galleries in The Hague, Rotterdam, Brussels and Antwerp. In 1935 he traveled to the opening of his exhibition in Cambridge. He did not live to see the retrospective exhibition in Paris organised by Georges Wildenstein.

Rybak was a contemporary of Jewish-Russian artists Natan Issajewitsch Altman, Boris Aronson and Marc Chagall, who transmitted the Jewish tradition in modern art.

Most of the works he left behind are in the Museum Ryback in Bat Yam in Israel, a part of the MoBY-Museums of Bat Yam complex.

Gallery

Publications (selection) 
 Ausstellung. J. Ryback. Buch u. Kunstdruckerei Lutze und Vogt, Berlin 1923.
 A l'ombre du passe. Les Editions Graphiques, Paris 1932.
 Leib Kwitko: In Vald ("Im Wald"), Zeichnungen von Issachar Ryback, Schwellen Verlag, Berlin 1922. In Jiddisch und in deutscher Übersetzung enthalten in: David Bergelson, Lejb Kwitko, Peretz Markisch, Ber Smoliar: Der Galaganer Hahn: jiddische Kinderbücher aus Berlin; jiddisch und deutsch, Aus d. Jidd. übertr. und hrsg. von Andrej Jendrusch, Berlin: Ed. DODO, 2003  
 Leib Kwitko: Voigelen ("Vögel"), Zeichnungen von Issachar Ryback, Schwellen Verlag, Berlin 1922. In Jiddisch und in deutscher Übersetzung enthalten in: David Bergelson, Lejb Kwitko, Peretz Markisch, Ber Smoliar: Der Galaganer Hahn: jiddische Kinderbücher aus Berlin; jiddisch und deutsch, Aus d. Jidd. übertr. und hrsg. von Andrej Jendrusch, Berlin: Ed. DODO, 2003

Literature 
 Salomon Wininger: Große jüdische National-Biographie. Kraus Reprint, Nendeln 1979,  (Nachdr. d. Ausg. Czernowitz 1925). Band 5, S. 189
 Issesokher Ber Ribak: zayn lebn un shafn. Funm Komitet tsu fareybikn dem ondek fun Issesokher Ber Ribak, Paris 1937
 Zalmen Reyzen: Ryback Issakhar Ber. In: Lexikon fun der yiddisher literatur, presse un filologie. Band 4, Farlag fun B. Kletskin, Wilna 1929, S. 316–320
 Raymond Cogniat: I. Ryback. Ėditions L’Amitié Française, Paris 1934.
 Karl Schwarz: Jewish Artists of the 19h and 20h Centuries. New York 1949, S. 203–207
 Mané-Katz – Issachar Ryback: Connections. Mané-Katz Museum, Spring 1993. Haifa, 1993.
 KULTUR-LIGE Artistic Avant-Garde of the 1910s and the 1920s. 20. Dezember 2007 – 20. Januar 2008, Nationales Kunstmuseum der Ukraine

External links

 
 Issachar Ber Ryback ataatc
 Issachar Ber Ryback at Comité & Foundation Issachar Ber Ryback
 About Ryback at jewish.ru (in Russian)
 Seth L. Wolitz: Rybak, Yisakhar Ber, Biography at YIVO Encyclopedia

References 

Cubist artists
Expressionist painters
Artists from Kropyvnytskyi
French male painters
Emigrants from the Russian Empire to France
Russian painters
Russian male painters
Russian printmakers
Ukrainian Jews
Ukrainian male painters
1897 births
1935 deaths
20th-century French printmakers
20th-century illustrators of fairy tales